The Dodge Lancer is an automobile that was marketed in three unrelated versions by Dodge during the 1950s, 1960s, and 1980s. The first version debuted as a hardtop version of the full-sized 1955 Dodge, and was produced in that form until 1959. The second version revived the nameplate in 1961 for a Chrysler A platform-based compact that was marketed for two model years and replaced by the Dodge Dart. The third version returned the Lancer nameplate in 1985 for a front-wheel drive mid-sized Chrysler H platform model that was in production until 1988 after which it was replaced by the Dodge Spirit.

1955–1959 Coronet Lancer, Royal Lancer and Custom Royal Lancer

Dodge used the Lancer name from 1955 until 1959 to designate the two- and four-door hardtop (no B-pillar) models in the full-sized Coronet, Royal, and Custom Royal lines. The Custom Royal Lancer was a hardtop only and top-of-the-line model for Dodge in 1959. There were 6,278 two-door and 5,019 four-door hardtops made in 1959. A total of 11,397 Custom Royal Lancers were built.

The Custom Royal Lancer featured a big-block V8 engine, the  producing .

The Custom Royal Lancer featured a padded dashboard and steering wheel, Lancer emblems on the fenders, steering wheel, hubcaps, foot-operated windshield wipers, dual-radio antennas, deluxe side trim, and thick chrome eyebrows. Optional equipment included power windows and brakes, air conditioning, and swivel seats. The Lancer designation was dropped for 1960.

1961–1962 Lancer

For the 1961 model year, Dodge applied the Lancer nameplate to a higher-priced, upmarket badge-engineered version of Chrysler's Valiant compact. The model was introduced when Chrysler officially assigned the Valiant to the Plymouth division for 1961, leaving Dodge dealers without a compact car to sell. All body styles of the Valiant were also available on the Lancer: two- and four-door sedans, two-door hardtop, and a four-door wagon. After 1962, the line was renamed the Dodge Dart.

A survey of 1961 Lancer owners by Popular Mechanics based on a total of  miles driven reported that 77.6.2% rated their cars as excellent with handling, comfortable ride, power/performance, and styling as their top likes.

Styling & trim

The Lancer wheelbase and body shell were identical to those of the Valiant, but interior and exterior trim were more upscale for the Lancer. Lancers featured round taillights and a full-width grille, instead of the Valiant's cat's-eye taillights and central grille. For 1961, trim levels were the basic "170" and the premium "770". During 1961, the two-door hardtop was marketed as the "Lancer 770 2-Door Hardtop". For the 1962 model year, the hardtop was marketed as the "GT 2-Door Hardtop" and carried premium trim. Two-tone paint was available and instead of the front bench seat, there were two bucket seats. Also for the 1962 model, "Lancer GT" medallions were mounted on the doors' interior trim panels below the vent window and on the sides of the front fenders just aft of the headlamps. "GT" emblems were placed on the hood, the deck lid, and on the vinyl dash pad. The headlamp bezels and the grille's horizontal slats were blacked-out. The GT also lacked certain ornamentation found on the 170s and 770s such as the "Lancer" door scripts, the slanted chrome hash marks on the lower quarter panel, and the hook-ended stainless steel door-to-fender spears.

Powertrains
The Lancer used the slant-6 engine. After the start of the 1961 model year, a die-cast aluminum version of the 225 engine block was made available. The aluminum 225 weighed  less than the iron 170 and  less than the iron 225. The Hyper-Pak shaved more than four seconds off the 0 to  time versus the standard 225, and was over a second quicker and seven miles per hour faster in the quarter mile.

Transmission options were a Chrysler-built A903 three-speed manual with the shifter on the floor in 1961 and on the steering column in 1962, or a pushbutton-operated A904 Torqueflite three-speed automatic.

Drag strip & sales competition
In the 1962 NHRA Winternationals, Wayne Weihe won the C/FX (Factory Experimental) class with a Hyper-Pak-equipped Lancer, clocking a 15.67 E.T. Although the bigger Dodges were beginning to appear at drag strips around the country, the "Golden Lancer" of Dode Martin and Jim Nelson was one of the fastest compacts on the strips in 1962. The engine was a  Chrysler RB V8 engine modified by the Chrysler engineers' "Ramchargers" racing team.

Lancer sales did not meet expectations and sold about half as well as the Valiant. As a late part of the total redesign of Dodge's compact car for 1963, the Lancer name was discontinued. Dodge compacts for 1963 through 1976 were named Dart, a name that had previously been assigned to a larger car produced by Dodge from 1960 through 1962.

South African market
In South Africa, a right hand drive version of the Lancer was sold from 1961 through 1963, badged as the DeSoto Rebel not long after the DeSoto name was discontinued in the U.S. All were equipped with the  Slant 6 engine, and most had the three-speed manual transmission. As with the Australian RV1 and SV1 Valiants, the DeSoto Rebel used the instrument cluster from the U.S. 1961 Plymouth Valiant. White reflectors were mounted to the front bumper, in compliance with South African vehicle equipment regulations.
 
The Rebel name was re-introduced by Chrysler South Africa in 1967 as the economy-priced "Valiant Rebel".

1985–1989 Lancer

The Dodge Lancer was re-introduced in 1985 as a mid-sized 5-door hatchback. It was a rebadged version of the Chrysler LeBaron GTS and was based on the Chrysler H platform, a stretched version of the Chrysler K platform. The Lancer eventually slotted between the Aries and the 600. All Lancers were built in Sterling Heights, Michigan. Production ended on April 7, 1989, and the market position was replaced by the Spirit.

Lancer Shelby

A special version was available for the 1987 as the Shelby Lancer which was built by Shelby Automobiles in Whittier, California. A total of 800 units were produced with half featuring a 5-speed manual transmission and cloth seats while 400 were equipped with a 3-speed automatic transmission and leather upholstery.

Along with some Shelby-themed trim changes, the cars included a modified suspension as well as 4-wheel disc brakes and CD player which were an advanced features for the time.

Chrysler took over production starting with the 1988 model year, building them in the same Sterling Heights plant as regular Lancers.
The "Dodge Lancer Shelby" featured appearance and handling modifications. These included upgraded sway bars, shorter springs, and quicker steering along with other comfort and convenience features such as leather seats, power locks, windows, seats and mirrors, a tilt steering wheel, and a two-position cup holder.

The intercooled Turbo II engine with the manual transmission provided . The automatic variant was equipped with the  Turbo I. Some of the suspension modifications were included as the 1987 Shelbys, but the rear disk brakes were discontinued in favor of the regular Lancer's rear drums. Although it was not planned as a limited edition, 279 Lancer Shelbys were produced in 1988 and 208 in 1989 for a total of 487 units.

European market
In April 1988, Chrysler started offering some models on the European market. One of them was the "Chrysler GTS", a rebadged version of the Dodge Lancer ES. Due to European vehicle regulations, the exterior appearance was slightly different. The rear turn signals were amber rather than red, the front sidemarkers and the centre high mount stop lamp (CHMSL) were blanked off, small round repeaters were installed into the front fenders and the sideview mirrors were of spring-hinged rather than rigid design. The engine options included the naturally aspirated  Four, and a turbocharged version of the same engine. From 1989 on, the  Four became available with or without a turbocharger. The 2.2 engine was dropped, except for the Turbo II version that was standard equipment on the Chrysler GTS Shelby, the European sibling of the Dodge Lancer Shelby. A five-speed manual gearbox was standard, with a three-speed automatic transmission as an extra-cost option. The GTS Shelby came only with a manual transmission.

The Chrysler GTS had few buyers in Europe; the competition was too hard. Even the comparatively low prices could not help, and sales figures were very low. By the end of 1989, the GTS was replaced by the Saratoga.

Production Figures:

References

External links
 

Lancer
Compact cars
Front-wheel-drive vehicles
Mid-size cars
Rear-wheel-drive vehicles
Coupés
Hatchbacks
Sedans
Station wagons
1960s cars
Cars introduced in 1955
Cars introduced in 1961
Cars introduced in 1985
Cars discontinued in 1989